Thunder and Roses may refer to:

 Thunder & Roses, an album by Pam Tillis
 Thunder And Roses, a racehorse
"Thunder and Roses", a 1957 story by Theodore Sturgeon
 Thunder and Roses, a 1993 novel by Mary Jo Putney